Paecilomyces is a genus of fungi. A number of species in this genus are plant pathogens.

Several of the entomopathogenic species, such as "Paecilomyces fumosoroseus" have now been placed in the genus Isaria: in the order Hypocreales and family Cordycipitaceae.

In 1974, R.A. Samson transferred the nematicidal species Paecilomyces lilacinus to this genus. However, publications in the 2000s (decade) indicated that the genus Paecilomyces was not monophyletic, and the new genus Purpureocillium was created to hold the taxon which includes P. lilacinum: with both parts of the name referring to the purple conidia produced by the fungus.

Species

Paecilomyces aegyptiacus
Paecilomyces aerugineus
Paecilomyces albus
Paecilomyces andoi
Paecilomyces antarcticus
Paecilomyces aspergilloides
Paecilomyces atrovirens
Paecilomyces aureocinnamomeus
Paecilomyces austriacus
Paecilomyces baarnensis
Paecilomyces borysthenicus
Paecilomyces breviramosus
Paecilomyces brunneolus
Paecilomyces burci
Paecilomyces byssochlamydoides
Paecilomyces canadensis
Paecilomyces carneus
Paecilomyces cinnabarinus
Paecilomyces cinnamomeus
Paecilomyces clavisporus
Paecilomyces cossus
Paecilomyces cremeoroseus
Paecilomyces cylindricosporus
Paecilomyces dactylethromorphus
Paecilomyces erectus
Paecilomyces eriophytis
Paecilomyces fimetarius
Paecilomyces formosa
Paecilomyces fulvus
Paecilomyces fuscatus
Paecilomyces griseoviridis
Paecilomyces guaensis
Paecilomyces gunnii
Paecilomyces hawkesii
Paecilomyces heliothis
Paecilomyces hepiali
Paecilomyces hibernicus
Paecilomyces huaxiensis
Paecilomyces indicus
Paecilomyces isarioides
Paecilomyces laeensis
Paecilomyces lecythidis
Paecilomyces longipes
Paecilomyces loushanensis
Paecilomyces major
Paecilomyces mandshuricus
Paecilomyces marquandii
Paecilomyces maximus
Paecilomyces musicola
Paecilomyces niphetodes
Paecilomyces niveus
Paecilomyces odonatae
Paecilomyces paranaensis
Paecilomyces parvisporus
Paecilomyces pascuus
Paecilomyces penicillatus
Paecilomyces persimplex
Paecilomyces puntonii
Paecilomyces purpureus
Paecilomyces ramosus
Paecilomyces rariramus
Paecilomyces reniformis
Paecilomyces saturatus
Paecilomyces simplex
Paecilomyces sinensis
Paecilomyces smilanensis
Paecilomyces spectabilis
Paecilomyces stipitatus
Paecilomyces subflavus
Paecilomyces subglobosus
Paecilomyces suffultus
Paecilomyces taitungiacus
Paecilomyces tenuipes
Paecilomyces tenuis
Paecilomyces terricola
Paecilomyces variotii
Paecilomyces verrucosus
Paecilomyces verticillatus
Paecilomyces victoriae
Paecilomyces vinaceus
Paecilomyces viridulus
Paecilomyces wawuensis
Paecilomyces xylariiformis
Paecilomyces zollerniae

See also
  Cordyceps
 Entomopathogenic fungus
 Tarsonemidae

References

External links
 University of Adelaide
 Mold-Help

Trichocomaceae
Carnivorous fungi
Fungal pest control agents
Eurotiomycetes genera
Taxa described in 1974